Pandit Sham Sundar Narain Tankha was an Indian politician. He was a Member of Parliament, representing Uttar Pradesh in the Rajya Sabha the upper house of India's Parliament as a member of the  Indian National Congress.

References

Rajya Sabha members from Uttar Pradesh
Indian National Congress politicians
1898 births
1985 deaths